Ankitta Sharma is an Indian television actress. She is the winner of Ticket to Bollywood. She made her television debut with Lajwanti (TV series).

Ankitta is best known for portraying the role of Naina Chauhan in Ek Shringaar-Swabhiman. She has also appeared in Yeh Vaada Raha (TV series) as the antagonist and in Laal Ishq (2018 TV series).

She played the lead role in ZEE5 series Ishq Aaj Kal and recently appeared in The Whistleblower.

Early life and career 
Sharma hails from Chandigarh and entered acting after winning the reality show Ticket to Bollywood in 2014. She made her television debut with the Zee TV's historical show Lajwanti playing the lead role.

She gained attention after playing the female lead in the Colors TV family drama Ek Shringaar-Swabhiman opposite Samridh Bawa.
In 2021, she is acting as lead role in the Sony Liv OTT webseries - The Whistleblower

Filmography

Television

Films

Web series

Awards and nominations

Trivia 
In the Indian television industry, there is also another actress known as Ankita Sharma. Ankitta Sharma and Ankita Sharma are two different people.

References

External links 
 
 

Living people
Indian television actresses
Actresses in Hindi television
21st-century Indian actresses
1994 births